Eesti Merelaevandus or ESCO, also called Estonian Shipping Company is an Estonian shipping company that currently operates eight multipurpose dry cargo and container ships. Technical management of the ships is performed by First Baltic Shipmanagement. The company is owned by the Tschudi Group that bought it from the Government of Estonia in 1997. Between 1940 and 1991 the company was part of the Soviet Union Merchant Fleet.

ESCO was also a co-founder, and for a time the sole owner, of Tallink and Estline.

The company was deleted from the business register due to the end of bankruptcy proceedings in 2019.

References

External links
 

Dry bulk shipping companies
Shipping companies of Estonia
Shipping companies of the Soviet Union
Transport companies established in 1991
1991 establishments in Estonia